.si is the Internet country code top-level domain (ccTLD) for Slovenia. It is administered by the ARNES, the Academic and Research Network of Slovenia. In 2010, the registry hosted 80,000 domain names. In 2012, that number increased to 100,000.

Domain hacks
Domain hacks for the .si TLD are quite popular, since si is second person singular of the verb 'to be' in Slovene. As such, many domains have been created that are using such domain hacks, one of the most popular being zadovoljna.si ('You are pleased', feminine form).

Sí also translates from Spanish as yes, so the TLD has been used by some Spanish-language websites. A notable example of this is the Mexican political party MORENA, whose website is found at morena.si.

Italian party Sinistra Italiana (abbreviation: SI) also uses Slovenian domain for its website (sinistraitaliana.si).

Pepsi uses the URL shortening pep.si.

Risk
According to research by McAfee performed in 2010, the Slovenian TLD is the tenth most secure.

References

External links
 IANA .si whois information
 ARNES
 Official .si registry website (English)
 Official .si registry website (Slovene)
 Unofficial directory of .si domains
 Unofficial .si registry website (Slovene) – statistical data and expired .si domains 

Country code top-level domains
Council of European National Top Level Domain Registries members
Internet in Slovenia
Computer-related introductions in 1992

sv:Toppdomän#S